Chełmek may refer to the following places:
Chełmek in Lesser Poland Voivodeship (south Poland)
Chełmek, Lubusz Voivodeship (west Poland)
Chełmek, Pomeranian Voivodeship (north Poland)